Shane Victor (born 29 December 1988) is a South African sprinter who specializes in the 400 metres. 
He won a silver medal in the 4 × 400 m relay at the 2011 World Championships in Athletics in Daegu.

At the 2012 Summer Olympics, Victor was part of the South African team in the 4x400 metres relay race. In the first semifinal, Ofentse Mogawane fell and dislocated his shoulder when he collided with Kenya's Vincent Kiilu, resulting in South Africa's withdrawal from the race. South Africa was passed into the final on appeal to the IAAF, due to interference from the Kenyan athlete who downed Mogawane. They were assigned the 9th lane and finished in 8th place with their season's best time of 3:03.46.

References

External links

1988 births
Living people
South African male sprinters
World Athletics Championships medalists
Universiade medalists in athletics (track and field)
Universiade bronze medalists for South Africa
Medalists at the 2011 Summer Universiade